Phractura ansorgii, commonly known as the African whiptailed catfish, is a species of catfish in the genus Phractura. They live in the Niger and Oshun rivers in Africa. These fish eat algae. Their length ranges from 8 cm to 10 cm. It is named in honor of William John Ansorge.

References

ansorgii
Freshwater fish of West Africa
Endemic fauna of Nigeria
Taxa named by George Albert Boulenger
Fish described in 1901